Winston-Salem Air Force Station (ADC ID: M-130 NORAD ID: Z-130) is a closed United States Air Force General Surveillance Radar station. It was closed in 1970.

History
Winston-Salem AFS was established in 1954 by Air Defense Command as one of a planned deployment of forty-four Mobile radar stations to support the permanent ADC Radar network in the United States sited around the perimeter of the country. This deployment was projected to be operational by mid-1952. Funding, constant site changes, construction, and equipment delivery delayed deployment.

This site became operational on 1 December 1956 when the 810th Aircraft Control and Warning Squadron was assigned to Winston-Salem AFS with AN/MPS-11 and AN/FPS-6A radars, and initially the station functioned as a Ground-Control Intercept (GCI) and warning station.  As a GCI station, the squadron's role was to guide interceptor aircraft toward unidentified intruders picked up on the unit's radar scopes.   The  AN/MPS-11 set was replaced by an AN/FPS-8 radar that saw service between 1960 and 1962. In 1962 the 810th began operating AN/FPS-24 search and AN/FPS-26 height-finder radars along with the previously installed AN/FPS-6 set.

During 1962 Winston-Salem AFS joined the Semi Automatic Ground Environment (SAGE) system, initially feeding data to DC-04 at Fort Lee AFS, Virginia.  After joining, the squadron was redesignated as the 810th Radar Squadron (SAGE) on 1 March 1962. The radar squadron provided information 24/7 the SAGE Direction Center where it was analyzed to determine range, direction altitude speed and whether or not aircraft were friendly or hostile. On 31 July 1963, the site was redesignated as NORAD ID Z-130.  The AN/FPS-6A was retired in 1968.

In addition to the main facility, Winston-Salem AFS operated an AN/FPS-18 unmanned Gap Filler site:  
 Allen, NC (M-130B/Z-130B): 

The 810th was inactivated on 31 July 1970 as part of a general reduction of Aerospace Defense Command air defense units.

Today some former USAF buildings now used as part of a light industrial complex.  The large AN/FPS-24 tower still stands, as well as most of the support buildings and barracks.  The housing area is in private hands. Some of the buildings are used by ARCA Addiction Recovery Care Association and Google offers an excellent view at http://goo.gl/maps/MJQ27 where the radar building can be seen clearly without the radar that was once on top of the structure. During the late 1960s the base was visited by both Club and Boy Scout troops as part of a Merit Badge exercise.

Air Force units and assignments

Units
 Constituted as the 810th Aircraft Control and Warning Squadron
 Activated at Dobbins AFB (M-111), GA on 20 June 1953 (not equipped or manned) 
 Moved to Andrews AFB (SM-171), MD on 1 July 1956 (not equipped or manned)
 Moved to Winston-Salem AFS on 1 December 1956
 Redesignated as 810th Radar Squadron (SAGE) on 1 March 1962
 Inactivated on 31 July 1970

Assignments
 85th Air Division, 1 July 1956
 35th Air Division, 1 September 1958
 32d Air Division, 15 November 1958
 Washington Air Defense Sector, 1 July 1961
 33d Air Division, 1 April 1966
 20th Air Division, 19 November 1969 – 31 July 1970

See also
 List of USAF Aerospace Defense Command General Surveillance Radar Stations

References

 Cornett, Lloyd H. and Johnson, Mildred W., A Handbook of Aerospace Defense Organization  1946 - 1980, Office of History, Aerospace Defense Center, Peterson AFB, CO (1980).
 Winkler, David F. & Webster, Julie L., Searching the Skies, The Legacy of the United States Cold War Defense Radar Program, US Army Construction Engineering Research Laboratories, Champaign, IL (1997).
 Information for Winston-Salem AFS, NC

Installations of the United States Air Force in North Carolina
Radar stations of the United States Air Force
Aerospace Defense Command military installations
1956 establishments in North Carolina
1978 disestablishments in North Carolina
Military installations established in 1956
Military installations closed in 1978